Michigan City High School is located in Michigan City, Indiana.

History
Michigan City High School was formed by the merger of Rogers High School and Elston High School in 1995.  Michigan City High School is located on the former campus of Rogers High School.

Demographics
The demographic breakdown of the 1,801 students enrolled as of the 2012-2013 school year is as follows:
 Male - 50.3%
 Female - 49.7%
 American Indian/Alaskan - 0.4%
 Asian/Pacific Islander - 0.7%
 Black - 30.9%
 Hispanic - 6.8%
 White - 54.4%
 Multiracial - 6.8%

Athletics
Michigan City High School is a member of the Duneland Athletic Conference.  MCHS is a class 5A school for boys' football and a class 4A school for all other sports, and is a member of the Indiana High School Athletic Association.  Students participate in Men and Women's Soccer, Men and Women's Golf, Tennis, Swimming, Diving, Basketball, Track, Field, and Cross Country; as well as Softball, Baseball, Wrestling, Cheerleading, Football, Gymnastics, and Volleyball. In 1995, the volleyball team won the Indiana state championship.  In addition, Elston High School won the following state titles: Boys' basketball - 1966; girls' cross country - 1993, 1994; and boys' golf - 1940.  Rogers High School won state championships in girls' golf in 1981 and 1982.

The Wolves Den
Michigan City High School houses Indiana's eighth largest public high school gymnasium, "The Wolves Den."  The Wolves Den is also the ninth largest high school gymnasium in the United States, with a seating capacity of 7304.

Ames Field
The original Ames Field was home to the Michigan City White Caps from 1956-1959.  The original multipurpose sports facility was demolished in 1995 to make room for expanded stadium.  Ames Field is named after George Ames, an early businessman and mayor of Michigan City in the late 1800s. In the spring of 2009, the stadium's playing surface was replaced with artificial field turf at the price $718,396 in lieu of re-sodding the heavily damaged turf.

Extracurricular activities
Available at Michigan City High School are:  National Honor Society, Rho Kappa, Student Council, Morning Broadcasting, Tech Club, Show Choir, Marching Band, Jazz Band, Pep Band, Drama Society, Japanese Club, French Club, Spanish Club, German Club, Wolvettes Dancing, Peer Tutoring, Ping Pong Club, Wednesdays with Yarn, Science Olympiad, Quiz Bowl, Junior Engineering Technical Society (JETS) TEAMS, and Art Club.

In March 2010, the MCHS Japanese department's Level 3 and 4 teams, won two state titles from the Japanese Olympiad of Indiana (JOI). This event, which tests students' knowledge of Japanese culture, history and society, was held at Valparaiso High School, attracted some 200 students from 15 high schools.

See also
 List of high schools in Indiana

References

External links
 

Public high schools in Indiana
Michigan City, Indiana
Educational institutions established in 1995
Schools in LaPorte County, Indiana
1995 establishments in Indiana